Cistus pouzolzii is a shrubby species of flowering plant in the family Cistaceae.

Phylogeny
Cistus pouzolzii belongs to the white and whitish pink flowered clade of Cistus species.

References

pouzolzii